Thembelani Bholi (born 18 January 1990) is a South African rugby union player for the  in the Pro14. His regular position is flanker, but he can also play as a lock.

Career

Youth

Bholi represented the Border Country Districts at the Under–18 Craven Week tournaments in both 2007 and 2008.

Bholi moved to Port Elizabeth in 2010 to join the  Academy.

Bholi was an ever-present for the side during the 2011 Under-21 Provincial Championship, starting all eight of their matches. However, the season had the same outcome as the previous one, with the  side making it all the way to the final, where they lost; this time they lost 23–19 to Eastern Cape rivals  in a match in Wellington.

Eastern Province Kings

Bholi was one of a group of eight players that graduated from the academy Eastern Province Kings in its first year, signing a contract with the team for the 2012 season. He was named in their 2012 Vodacom Cup and 2012 Currie Cup First Division squads, but suffered a shoulder injury that prevented him from playing in any matches.

He made his first class debut on 12 July 2013, but could not prevent his side suffer a narrow 18–22 defeat to their rivals from Potchefstroom.

Bholi started all seven of their matches in the 2014 Vodacom Cup competition, but could not help the team to qualify to the quarter-finals for a third successive season. However, he made enough of an impression that he was selected in the starting line-up for the  side that faced  during a tour match during a 2014 incoming tour. He played the entire match as the Kings suffered a 12–34 defeat. The Kings struggled to adjust to life in the Premier Division and lost their first nine matches of the season. They did, however, beat fellow promoted side the  26–25 in the final match of the season, with Bholi an unused reserve for that match. He made a total of seven appearances during the competition.

Bholi scored his first try for the EP Kings in first match of the 2015 Vodacom Cup season, a 19–27 defeat to defending champions .

References

1990 births
Living people
Blue Bulls players
Bulls (rugby union) players
Cheetahs (rugby union) players
Eastern Province Elephants players
Pumas (Currie Cup) players
Rugby union players from East London, Eastern Cape
Sharks (Currie Cup) players
Sharks (rugby union) players
South African rugby union players
Southern Kings players
Xhosa people
Rugby union flankers